David Engblom (born June 2, 1977) is a Swedish former professional ice hockey player (left wing). Engblom's youth team is Vallentuna BK. From the 1995–96 season to his retirement in 2011, he played in AIK, except for the 2000–01 season, when Engblom played in Skellefteå AIK of the (now named) HockeyAllsvenskan. Engblom was one of the alternate captains in AIK. After being denied an extended contract with AIK after the 2010–11 season, Engblom retired, but instead continues to work for AIK as a materials manager.

Career statistics

Regular season and playoffs

International

References

External links 

Living people
1977 births
AIK IF players
Detroit Red Wings draft picks
Swedish ice hockey left wingers